Parliamentary elections were held in Cyprus on 26 May 1996. The result was a victory for the Democratic Rally, which won 20 of the 56 seats. Voter turnout was 92.9%.

Results

References

1996 in Cyprus
Cyprus
Legislative elections in Cyprus
May 1996 events in Europe